Cyana klohsi is a moth of the family Erebidae. It was described by Timm Karisch in 2003 and is endemic to Democratic Republic of the Congo.

References

klohsi
Moths described in 2003
Endemic fauna of the Democratic Republic of the Congo
Insects of the Democratic Republic of the Congo
Moths of Africa